Soueif is a surname. Notable people with the surname include:

Ahdaf Soueif (born 1950), Egyptian novelist and political and cultural commentator
Joseph Soueif (born 1962), Lebanese bishop
Laila Soueif (born 1956), Egyptian human and women's rights activist, and mathematician, sister of Ahdaf